The 1965 Dhanbad coal mine disaster  occurred on 28 May 1965, in a coal mine near Dhanbad, India. An explosion occurred in Dhori colliery near Dhanbad, which led to fire in the mine. The fire killed 268 miners. Dhori colliery is located near Bermo. The mine was at the time owned by the Raja of Ramgarh.

References 

Coal mining disasters in India
Mining disasters in India
Dhanbad Coal Mine Disaster, 1965
Dhanbad Coal Mine Disaster, 1965
History of Jharkhand (1947–present)
Disasters in Jharkhand
Dhanbad district
Dhanbad
1960s in Jharkhand